

References 

Buckinghamshire
King G
Lists of buildings and structures in Buckinghamshire